Abukari Damba (born 30 December 1968) is a retired Ghanaian football goalkeeper.

Career
He played for Real Tamale United in Ghana, and also in Perak FA in Malaysia. He was also capped for Ghana. Damba was selected as a reserve goalkeeper for the 1992 African Cup of Nations finals.

After he retired from playing, Damba became a football coach. He was the Ghana national team's goalkeeping coach before being asked to step down following corruption accusations in July 2007. Damba is the goalkeeping coach for Accra Hearts of Oak SC.

References

Living people
Ghanaian footballers
Ghana international footballers
1992 African Cup of Nations players
Accra Great Olympics F.C. players
Perak F.C. players
Dagomba people
Expatriate footballers in Malaysia
Ghanaian expatriate footballers
Ghanaian expatriate sportspeople in Malaysia
1978 births
Association football goalkeepers
People from Northern Region (Ghana)
Real Tamale United players
Accra Hearts of Oak S.C. non-playing staff
Association football goalkeeping coaches